The 2006 Masters Tournament was the 70th Masters Tournament, played April 6–9 at Augusta National Golf Club in Augusta, Georgia. Phil Mickelson won the second of his three Masters and second consecutive major with a 281 (–7), two strokes ahead of runner-up Tim Clark. The purse was $7 million and the winner's share was $1.26 million.

This was the final Masters appearance for three-time champion Nick Faldo.

Course

Field
1. Masters champions
Charles Coody, Fred Couples (12,14,16,17), Ben Crenshaw, Nick Faldo, Raymond Floyd, Bernhard Langer, Sandy Lyle, Phil Mickelson (4,10,13,14,16,17), Larry Mize, José María Olazábal (12,16,17), Mark O'Meara, Gary Player, Vijay Singh (4,10,11,14,15,16,17), Craig Stadler, Tom Watson, Mike Weir (10,16,17), Tiger Woods (2,3,10,11,12,13,14,15,16,17), Ian Woosnam, Fuzzy Zoeller

Tommy Aaron, Seve Ballesteros, Gay Brewer, Jack Burke Jr., Billy Casper, Doug Ford, Bob Goalby, Byron Nelson, Jack Nicklaus, and Arnold Palmer did not play.

2. U.S. Open champions (last five years)
Michael Campbell (11,16,17), Jim Furyk (14,16,17), Retief Goosen (10,14,16,17)

3. The Open champions (last five years)
Ben Curtis, David Duval, Ernie Els (16,17), Todd Hamilton

4. PGA champions (last five years)
Rich Beem, Shaun Micheel, David Toms (14,15,16,17)

5. The Players Championship winners (last three years)
Stephen Ames (15,17), Fred Funk (14,16,17), Adam Scott (14,16,17)

6. U.S. Amateur champion and runner-up
Dillon Dougherty (a), Edoardo Molinari (a)

7. The Amateur champion
Brian McElhinney (a)

8. U.S. Amateur Public Links champion
Clay Ogden (a)

9. U.S. Mid-Amateur champion
Kevin Marsh (a)

10. Top 16 players and ties from the 2005 Masters
Chris DiMarco (14,16,17), Luke Donald (14,15,16,17), Mark Hensby (11,16), Tim Herron (14,16), David Howell (16,17), Trevor Immelman, Tom Lehman (16,17), Justin Leonard (14,16,17), Thomas Levet, Rod Pampling (16,17)
Ryan Moore did not play, as he was recovering from wrist surgery.

11. Top eight players and ties from the 2005 U.S. Open
Tim Clark (14,16,17), Sergio García (14,16,17), Davis Love III (13,14,16,17), Rocco Mediate

12. Top four players and ties from the 2005 Open Championship
Colin Montgomerie (16,17)

13. Top four players and ties from 2005 PGA Championship
Thomas Bjørn (16,17)
Steve Elkington did not play due to a groin injury.

14. Top 40 players from the 2005 PGA Tour money list
Stuart Appleby (15,16,17), Jason Bohn, Olin Browne, Bart Bryant (16,17), Mark Calcavecchia, Chad Campbell (15,16,17), K. J. Choi (16,17), Ben Crane (16,17), Lucas Glover, Pádraig Harrington (16,17), Charles Howell III, Brandt Jobe (16,17), Zach Johnson (17), Peter Lonard (16), Shigeki Maruyama (16), Billy Mayfair, Joe Ogilvie, Geoff Ogilvy (15,16,17), Sean O'Hair (16,17), Carl Pettersson (17), Ted Purdy, Vaughn Taylor, Scott Verplank (16,17)
Kenny Perry (16,17) did not play, as he was recovering from knee surgery.

15. Top 10 players from the 2006 PGA Tour money list on March 27
Arron Oberholser (17), Rory Sabbatini (17)

16. Top 50 players from the final 2005 world ranking
Robert Allenby (17), Ángel Cabrera (17), Stewart Cink (17), Darren Clarke (17), John Daly, Miguel Ángel Jiménez (17), Shingo Katayama (17), Paul McGinley (17), Nick O'Hern (17), Henrik Stenson (17), Lee Westwood (17)

17. Top 50 players from world ranking published March 27
All such players were eligible under higher categories.

18. Special foreign invitation
Thongchai Jaidee

Round summaries

First round
Thursday, April 6, 2006

Eighteen players broke par on the lengthened Augusta National. Vijay Singh, the 2000 champion, shot a five-under 67 to take the first round lead by one stroke over Rocco Mediate.  Arron Oberholser was next with a 69 for solo third place. Four others were at 70, including 2004 champion Phil Mickelson and two-time U.S. Open champion Retief Goosen. Defending champion Tiger Woods shot an even-par 72, despite a pair of three-putt bogeys and a double bogey on the par-5 15th hole.

Second round
Friday, April 7, 2006

Chad Campbell, with just one top ten result at a major (runner-up at 2003 PGA Championship), led at the halfway point by three strokes at 138 (–6). His 67 (–5) on Friday was one of only three scores in the 60s. In a tie for second at 141 (–3) was Singh, Mediate, and 1992 champion Fred Couples. Mickelson shot even par for the round and was among a group tied for fifth at 142 (–2). The cut came at 148 (+4); among the notables to miss the cut was Chris DiMarco, the playoff runner-up to Woods in 2005. This was 1971 champ Charles Coody's final entry as a competitor; after struggling in his opening round to an 89, he played very well (at age 68) in round 2, carding a 2-over par 74 for his last competitive round at Augusta.

Amateurs: McElhinney (+11), Molinari (+13), Ogden (+15), Dougherty (+16), Marsh (+16).

Third round
Saturday, April 8, 2006
Sunday, April 9, 2006

Thunderstorms postponed a good chunk of action in the third round, forcing it to be completed on Sunday morning. Mickelson moved to the top of the leaderboard with a two-under 70 to 212 (–4). Second round leader Campbell shot 75 (+3) to fall into a tie for second with Couples, who shot even par for the round. Woods shot 71 for 214, two strokes back in a six-way tie for fourth, along with Singh and four others.

Final round
Sunday, April 9, 2006

Summary
Mickelson won his second consecutive major (2005 PGA Championship) and his second green jacket with a final round 69 for a two-stroke victory over Tim Clark. Mickelson's lone bogey was at the final hole, when he had victory all but assured. The win also gave him his third major in the last nine. Clark finished in solo second by holing-out from a green side bunker at the 72nd hole. Woods shot a two-under 70 to finish three strokes behind Mickelson in a five-way tie for third. Others finishing in third place were Couples, Goosen, Campbell, and José María Olazábal, the 1994 and 1999 champion, who shot the round of the tournament, a six-under 66. Sadly, Mediate fell out of contention after hitting three balls into the water and making a ten at the par-3 12th.

Final leaderboard

Scorecard

Cumulative tournament scores, relative to par
{|class="wikitable" span = 50 style="font-size:85%;
|-
|style="background: Red;" width=10|
|Eagle
|style="background: Pink;" width=10|
|Birdie
|style="background: PaleGreen;" width=10|
|Bogey
|style="background: Green;" width=10|
|Double bogey
|style="background: Olive;" width=10|
|Triple bogey+
|}
Source:

Par 3 Contest
Ben Crane won the annual Par 3 contest, which took place on Wednesday, April 5, with a four-under 23. Arnold Palmer and Jack Nicklaus, made a curtain call at the event; Nicklaus was one-under and was in contention throughout the day. Pádraig Harrington, Clark, and Oberholser all aced the  ninth hole.

References

External links
Masters.com – past winners
Coverage on the European Tour's official site
Augusta.com – 2006 Masters leaderboard and scorecards

2006
2006 in golf
2006 in American sports
2006 in sports in Georgia (U.S. state)
April 2006 sports events in the United States